Chierici is a surname. Notable people with the surname include:

 Alfonso Chierici (1816–1873), Italian painter
 Gaetano Chierici (1838–1920), Italian painter
 Giovanni Chierici (1830–1917), Italian sculptor
 Lorenzo Chierici (1895–1943), Italian government official
 Vittoria Chierici (born 1955), Italian artist

See also
 Chierico, surname
 Palazzo del Seminario dei Chierici, palace in Sicily

Italian-language surnames